Zhalay Sarhadi, also spelled Zille Sarhadi, (born on 11 June 1981) is a Pakistani actress, model, and former VJ. Her notable performance include the series Uraan (2010), Aks (2012), Madiha Maliha (2012), Digest Writer (2014), Rang Laaga (2015), Nazo (2015), and Yaar Na Bichray (2021). In 2018, she received a Lux Style Award nomination for her performance in the film Chalay Thay Sath.

Career
Sarhadi began her career as an actress and later became a model, appearing in magazines such as Libaas as well as in runway shows. In 2015, she appeared in the film Jalaibee and in 2022, she had a part in Kashan Admani's directorial debut, Carma – The Movie.

Personal life
Sarhadi is the niece of actor Khayyam Sarhadi and granddaughter of Zia Sarhadi. She is married to Amir Anees. They have one daughter.

Selected filmography

Film

                                                                                                                                
Television

Music video

Awards and nominations
 2018 – Lux Style Awards – Best Supporting Actress for Chalay Thay Sath'' – Nominated

References

External links
 

1981 births
Living people
Actresses from Karachi
Pakistani television actresses
Pakistani female models
Pakistani television hosts
University of Karachi alumni
Pakistani film actresses
21st-century Pakistani actresses
Pakistani women television presenters